Drehersville is an unincorporated community on the Little Schuylkill River and the northwestern foot of Blue Mountain in East Brunswick Township and West Brunswick Township, Schuylkill County, Pennsylvania, United States. Route 895 passes through Drehersville, which serves as a western gateway for Hawk Mountain Sanctuary. It is pronounced "DRAY-herz-vil" or occasionally "DRAIRZ-vil." Drehersville is split between the New Ringgold and Orwigsburg post offices with the ZIP codes of 17960 and 17961, respectively.   It is served by the Blue Mountain School District.

Unincorporated communities in Schuylkill County, Pennsylvania
Unincorporated communities in Pennsylvania